The Clark County Courthouse is located at Courthouse Square (4th and Crittenden) in Arkadelphia, Arkansas, the seat of Clark County.  It is a -story Romanesque stone structure which was designed by Charles Thompson and completed in 1899.  It is a basically rectangular structure with a hip roof, and a six-story tower rising from the northwest corner.  It has a hip roof from which numerous hipped gables project, and there are corner turrets with conical roofs.  It is the county's second courthouse.

The building was listed on the National Register of Historic Places in 1978.

See also
 List of county courthouses in Arkansas
 National Register of Historic Places listings in Clark County, Arkansas

References

Courthouses on the National Register of Historic Places in Arkansas
County courthouses in Arkansas
Government buildings completed in 1899
Buildings and structures in Arkadelphia, Arkansas
Romanesque Revival architecture in Arkansas
1899 establishments in Arkansas
National Register of Historic Places in Clark County, Arkansas